Title 19 of the United States Code outlines the role of customs and duties in the United States Code.
 —Collection Districts, Ports, And Officers
 —Foreign Trade Zones
 —The Tariff Commission (repealed/omitted)
 —The Tariff and Related Provisions
 —Tariff Act of 1930
 —Smuggling
 —Trade Fair Program
 —Trade Expansion Program
 —Automotive Products
 —Visual and Auditory Materials of Educational, Scientific, and Cultural Character
 —Customs Service
 —Importation of Pre-Columbian Monumental or Architectural Sculpture or Murals
 —Trade Act of 1974
 —Trade Agreements Act of 1979
 —Convention on Cultural Property
 —Caribbean Basin Economic Recovery
 —Wine Trade
 —Negotiation and Implementation of Trade Agreements
 —Implementation of Harmonized Tariff Schedule
 —Telecommunications Trade
 —Andean Trade Preference
 —North American Free Trade
 —Uruguay Round Trade Agreements
 —Extension Of Certain Trade Benefits To Sub-Saharan Africa
 —Bipartisan Trade Promotion Authority
 —Clean Diamond Trade

See also 
 Customs

References

External links
U.S. Code Title 19, via United States Government Printing Office
U.S. Code Title 19, via Cornell University
U.S. Code Title 19

19
Title 19
Special economic zones of the United States